Marina Ivanovna Stepanova (née Makeyeva born 1 May 1950) is a Russian former athlete who competed for the Soviet Union in the 400 metres hurdles, and became the first woman to run under 53 seconds for the event, when she ran 52.94 secs in 1986.

Career
Born in Meglevo, Imeni Sverdlova settlement, Stepanova started to compete internationally in 1978 at the European Championships in Prague where she finished sixth in her semifinal heat. That year she had a PB of 56.19 seconds in the 400m hurdles. In 1979, she broke the world record for the first time, running 54.78 seconds at the Soviet Spartakiad, defeating previous world record holder Tatyana Zelentsova.

Stepanova retired at the end of the 1980 season and gave birth to a daughter in 1981. She returned in 1983 and quickly regained her form. Unable to attend the 1984 Olympic Games due to the Soviet-led boycott, she did improve her personal best to 53.67 seconds when winning at the 1984 Friendship Games, defeating the 1983 World champion Yekaterina Fesenko and world record holder Margarita Ponomaryova.

At the 1986 Goodwill Games in July, Stepanova won in 53.81 secs. A month later at the 1986 European Championships in Stuttgart, she won the gold medal in the world record time of 53.32 seconds. Three weeks later in Tashkent, Stepanova became the first woman in history to break 53 seconds in the 400 m hurdles, improving her world record to 52.94 seconds at the age of 36. This would remain the world record for seven years until Sally Gunnell ran 52.74 secs in 1993. After the 1987 season she retired at the age of 37.

Personal Bests

References

1950 births
Living people
People from Vsevolozhsky District
Soviet female hurdlers
Russian female hurdlers
European Athletics Championships medalists
World record setters in athletics (track and field)
Goodwill Games medalists in athletics
Competitors at the 1986 Goodwill Games
Friendship Games medalists in athletics
Sportspeople from Leningrad Oblast